The Women's 7.5 kilometre classical competition of the 2018 Winter Paralympics was held at Alpensia Biathlon Centre,
South Korea. The competition took place on 17 March 2018.

Medal table

7.5 km classical visually impaired
In the cross-country skiing visually impaired, the athlete with a visual impairment has a sighted guide. The two skiers are considered a team, and dual medals are awarded.

The race was started at 11:55.

7.5 km classical standing
The race was started at 11:45.

5 km sitting
The race was started at 13:00.

See also
Cross-country skiing at the 2018 Winter Olympics

References

Women's 7.5 kilometre classical
Para